The New Afton mine is a Canadian gold and copper mine located  west of the city of Kamloops in British Columbia.

As of December 2019, the proven and probable reserves of the mine were 1.0 million ounces of gold, 2.8 million ounces of silver, and 802 million pounds of copper.

Staff 
About 744 (2022) Kamloops-area workers work on site. These workers used to work shifts seven days on and then get seven days off. The mine has recently moved to a fourteen-day on, fourteen-day off schedule.

Geology 
The New Afton mineralization is classified as an alkalic porphyry copper-gold deposit. The deposits are located in the southern part of the Quesnel trough, in the Nicola belt.

See also
List of gold mines in Canada
List of copper mines in Canada
List of mines in British Columbia
Gibraltar Mine
Mount Polley mine
Geology of British Columbia

References

Silver mining in Canada
Gold mines in British Columbia
Copper mines in British Columbia